Holland is a city in the western region of the Lower Peninsula of the U.S. state of Michigan. It is situated near the eastern shore of Lake Michigan on Lake Macatawa, which is fed by the Macatawa River (formerly known locally as the Black River). 

As of the 2010 census, the population was 33,051, with an urbanized area population of 113,164, .

Holland is the largest city in both Ottawa and Allegan counties. The Ottawa County portion is part of the Grand Rapids-Kentwood Metropolitan Statistical Area, while the Allegan County portion is part of the Holland Micropolitan Statistical Area, which is coextensive with Allegan County. As of 2013, both areas are part of the Grand Rapids–Kentwood–Muskegon Combined Statistical Area. Holland was founded by Dutch Americans, and is in an area that has a large percentage of citizens of Dutch American heritage. It is home to Hope College and Western Theological Seminary, institutions of the Reformed Church in America.

In February 1996, the Holland City Council approved a sister city relationship between Santiago de Querétaro, Querétaro, Mexico, and the City of Holland.

History
Ottawa County was originally populated by Ottawa Indians. In 1846, Reverend George Smith established the Old Wing Mission as an outreach to the native population. The Ottawa living here were primarily practicing Catholics, but Smith tried converting them to Protestantism. While generally unsuccessful in converting the Native population, the two groups worked together relatively closely for a short time. This attempt to work and live together was not valued by the next group who arrived.

Holland was settled in 1847 by Dutch Calvinist separatists, under the leadership of Dr. Albertus van Raalte. Dire economic conditions in the Netherlands compelled them to emigrate, while their desire for religious freedom led them to unite and settle together as a group.

Van Raalte and his colony settled on land in the midst of the Ottawa (Odawa) people's Old Wing Mission Colony near the Black River where it streamed to Black Lake (now Lake Macatawa) which, in turn, led to Lake Michigan. The Dutch settlers and the Ottawa people never got along. Dutch settlers began stealing sugar and venison from the Ottawa. The Dutch were unwilling to accept the Ottawa people's mix of Catholic and Native culture. Soon, Dutch leaders tried to force the natives into wooded land in Allegan County. Eventually, the natives moved north to preserve their way of life and culture. Chief Peter Waukazoo and Reverend George Smith decided to move the community and the Ottawa Mission from Holland up to Northport (on the Leelanau Peninsula), voyaging on boats and canoes.

In Holland's early history, Van Raalte was a spiritual leader, as well as overseeing political, educational and financial matters. In 1847, Van Raalte established a congregation of the Reformed Church in America, which would later be called the First Reformed Church of Holland. On March 25, 1867, Holland was incorporated as a city with Isaac Cappon being the city's first mayor. The city suffered a major fire on October 8-9, 1871, at the same time as the Great Chicago Fire in Illinois and the very deadly Peshtigo Fire in Wisconsin. Due to the Great Michigan Fire (which included the Port Huron Fire of 1871), Manistee and Port Huron, Michigan, also burned at the same time.

In 1987, a 23-year-old City Council member, Phil Tanis, was elected mayor of Holland while he was still a Hope College student, becoming its youngest mayor.

Culture

The city is perhaps best known for its Dutch heritage, which serves not only as a part of the city's cultural identity, but the local economy as well: the Tulip Time Festival in May and various Dutch-themed attractions augment the nearby Lake Michigan shoreline in attracting thousands of tourists annually. Over 28% of the population identified as being of Dutch descent.

The Holland Museum contains exhibits about the city's history. Another, the Cappon House Museum, was built in 1874 and is a historic museum that once housed the first mayor of Holland, Dutch immigrant Isaac Cappon. The Settlers House Museum, a building that survived the great fire, contains furnishings and relics from the 19th century.

Holland's downtown is listed in the National Register of Historic Places. The "Snowmelt Project" established pipes transporting warm water from the nearby power plant to travel underneath downtown with the purpose of clearing the streets and sidewalks in the downtown area of any snow.

De Zwaan, an original 250-year-old Dutch windmill, is situated on Windmill Island, a municipal park.

Holland boasts an annual Fiesta, organized by Latin Americans United for Progress, usually on the Saturday closest to May 5 (Cinco de Mayo). Holland is also host to the annual Tulipanes Latino Art & Film Festival, which is held to celebrate the Latino contribution to the culture.

In 2013, Farmer's Insurance named the Holland/Grand Haven Area the most secure mid-sized city in the United States. In 2010, Holland was ranked the second healthiest/happiest town in the United States by the Well-being Index. 

In 2006, CNN Money named Holland as one of the top five places to retire.

Religion 
Holland is known as the "City of Churches." There are 170 churches in the greater Holland area, many of which are with the Reformed Church in America and Christian Reformed Church in North America denominations. The city is the home to the church that started the trend of the "What Would Jesus Do?" bracelets in 1989.

Tourism

Each May, Holland hosts an annual Tulip Time Festival. Tulip planting and the festival began in 1930 when 250,000 tulips were planted for the event. Currently six million tulips are used throughout the city. Tulips are planted along many city streets, in city parks and outside municipal buildings as well as at tourist attractions like Dutch Village, the city-owned Windmill Island Gardens, and at a large tulip farm named Veldheer Tulip Gardens. It is normally held the second week of May, during the tulip blooming season. Cruise ships such as the Yorktown from the Great Lakes Cruising Company make Holland a port of call.

About one million tourists visit Tulip Time each year, for which the community finds innovative ways to enhance self-funded projects. It has been ranked as America's third largest town festival and was named Reader's Digest'''s best small town festival. The Tulip Time Festival has attracted big-name acts in recent years such as: Christina Aguilera in 2000, O-Town in 2001, The Verve Pipe in 2004, and Jars of Clay in 2006. Ed McMahon visited Tulip Time in 2007 along with Bobby Vinton. Comedian Bill Cosby headlined the 2014 Tulip Time Festival.

Holland is located on Lake Macatawa, near the shores of Lake Michigan. Scattered along the shoreline are many public beach accesses including Tunnel Park and the widely popular Holland State Park. Across the channel from the State Park is the Holland Harbor Light, known as "Big Red." Smaller beaches along Lake Michigan are present but not well marked. Public accesses are frequent along dead-end streets bordering the shoreline.

The city's primary shopping district is centered along 8th Street, the city's main street downtown.

The 8th Street business district features a thermal snow-melting system which uses cooling water from the local electric plant. In 1988, the city rebuilt the entire street and sidewalk system, installing the thermal pipes underneath. The system will melt up to an inch an hour down to 15°.

Geography

Neighborhoods 
 Holland Heights

Climate

Demographics

2010 census
As of the census of 2010, there were 33,051 people, 12,021 households, and 7,593 families residing in the city.

Race and Hispanic or Latino Origin: The racial makeup of the city was 85.2% White alone, 4.0% Black or African American, 0.5% Native American, 3.9% Asian, 0.1% Pacific Islander, 5.0% from two or more races. Hispanic or Latino of any race were 22.7% of the population, and White not Hispanic or Latino were 70.0%.

There were 12,021 households, of which 32.8% had children under the age of 18 living with them, 46.5% were married couples living together, 11.9% had a female householder with no husband present, 4.7% had a male householder with no wife present, and 36.8% were non-families. 29.8% of all households were made up of individuals, and 13.5% had someone living alone who was 65 years of age or older. The average household size was 2.52 and the average family size was 3.13.

The median age in the city was 31.7 years. 24% of residents were under the age of 18; 16.5% were between the ages of 18 and 24; 24.7% were from 25 to 44; 21% were from 45 to 64; and 13.7% were 65 years of age or older. The gender makeup of the city was 47.5% male and 52.5% female.

Government
The City of Holland uses a council/manager form of government. The day-to-day operations of the city are under the supervision of the city manager and their staff. The city manager is responsible for selecting all department heads, preparation of the budget and supervision of all employees through their appointments.

The city manager serves at the direction of the mayor and city council which are elected positions. The current city manager is Keith Van Beek, former Ottawa County deputy county administrator, who was appointed in February 2018 by the city council. Soren Wolff served as the city manager from 1988 until his retirement in the Fall 2011. Soren previously served the city as assistant city manager in the mid-1970s and had a street named after him near Fairbanks Avenue and 13th Street, which is the main entrance to Smallenburg Park and many of Hope College's athletic facilities. The current assistant city manager is Matt VanDyken, the former IT director for the city.

Holland's city charter requires a mayor and eight city council members. The mayor serves a two-year term, and two at-large council members and six ward council members each serve four-year terms.

The current mayor is Nathan Bocks, a local attorney elected in November 2019.

City council members as of September 2022 are:
Ward 1 - Tim Vreeman
Ward 2 - Jay Peters
Ward 3 - Belinda Coronado
Ward 4 - Nicki Arendshorst
Ward 5 - Scott Corbin
Ward 6 - David Hoekstra
At-Large - Lyn Raymond
At-Large - Quincy Byrd

The Holland Board of Public Works was created in 1883. It provides electricity, water and sewer services.

Education
Higher level academic institutions
Hope College, a private four-year liberal arts college
Western Theological Seminary, a graduate and professional school
Grand Valley State University, with a campus in Holland (land donated to GVSU by the Meijer family)
Davenport University, with a regional campus in Holland

Public schools
Holland Public Schools
West Ottawa Public Schools, which serve the townships that comprise Holland's suburban and rural north side
Black River Public School, a charter school with kindergarten, elementary, secondary, and high school students
Vanderbilt Charter Academy (K-8)
Thompson M-TEC (Adult Training), a partnership between the Ottawa Area Intermediate School District and Grand Rapids Community College
Eagle Crest Charter Academy

Private schools
Holland Christian Schools (includes Holland Christian High School)
Corpus Christi Catholic School
Calvary Schools of Holland
Holland Seventh-day Adventist School

Industry
Holland is home to the world's largest pickle factory. The H.J. Heinz Company opened the factory at the same location in 1897, and currently processes over 1 million lbs. of pickles per day during the green season.
Adient - automotive seating
Haworth - office furniture
Herman Miller - home & office furniture
Johnson Controls - lithium-ion batteries
LG Chem - lithium-ion batteries
Tiara Yachts - luxury yachts/wind turbines
Kraft Heinz - pickles, sauces, mustards
Magna - engineered glass and mirrors

Transportation

The city is serviced by West Michigan Regional Airport , the Park Township Airport  having closed on August 15, 2020.

The city also is served by regularly scheduled Amtrak service (the Pere Marquette) east to Grand Rapids and west to Chicago with connections to all points east and west.

The city and surrounding area is served by the MAX (Macatawa Area Express) transportation system, which offers both on-demand and high-speed bus service, linking different parts of the city as well as commercial, medical and government locations outside the city. This service evolved from the former "Dial-A-Ride Transportation" (DART) system.

The city is served by the following highways: 

The channel between Lake Macatawa and Lake Michigan allows pleasure craft and commercial boats, even bulk freighters, to access Holland's docks to unload coal, salt and iron scrap.

Media

NewspapersHolland Sentinel, Holland's local daily newspaper/online editionGrand Rapids Press, formerly maintained a Holland newsroom and circulation office

Radio
WHTC, 1450 WHTC and The New 99.7 FM
WYVN, classic Hits for Holland and the Lakeshore, 92.7 FM
WTHS - Hope College radio station, 89.9 FM

Television
HCTV, Holland local television station

Fine arts

Art
Holland Area Arts Council

Music
Holland Chorale, Holland's auditioned chorus, presenting a full concert season of fine choral music
Holland Symphony Orchestra, professional symphony orchestra conducted by Maestro Johannes Müller-Stosch

Athletics

Notable people

Holland is the hometown of four Medal of Honor recipients  (only tying with Pueblo, CO also with four, both more than any other municipality in the United States) - John Essebagger Jr., Paul Ronald Lambers, Matt Urban, and Gordon Douglas Yntema. 

Harry Bannister, actor
L. Frank Baum (d. 1919), author of The Wonderful Wizard of Oz, had a holiday home named The Sign of the Goose in the resort community of Macatawa
Franklin Cappon, basketball coach, Michigan and Princeton
Charles F. Conrad, founder of Lake Michigan Carferry Service
Kirk Cousins, quarterback for Michigan State University and NFL's Minnesota Vikings
Brian D'Amato, author (Beauty, In the Courts of the Sun and its sequel The Sacrifice Game) and sculptor
Robert Danhof, jurist
Hopwood DePree, film producer, co-founder of Waterfront Film Festival
Betsy DeVos, U. S. Secretary of Education, 2017 - 2021
Max DePree, writer; industrialist; former CEO of Herman Miller, Inc.
John Essebagger Jr. (d. 1951), U.S. Army Corporal, Korean War; Medal of Honor
Kevin Haverdink, NFL player
Gerrard Wendell Haworth (d. 2006), founded office furniture manufacturer Haworth Company
Pete Hoekstra, U.S. Congressman from Michigan's 2nd Congressional District, 1993-2011; chairman of House Intelligence Committee, 2004-2007; ambassador to the Netherlands
Rhoda Janzen, Hope College professor, author of Mennonite in a Little Black DressMorley Jennings, player and Baylor coach in College Football Hall of Fame, born in Holland
Alex Koroknay-Palicz, youth rights advocate
Paul de Kruif (d. 1971), science writer (Microbe Hunters, etc.) retired to Holland, where he died
Paul Ronald Lambers (d. 1970), U.S. Army Staff sergeant, Vietnam War; Medal of Honor
Rob Malda, founder of Slashdot
Lisa McMann, young-adult fiction writer
James Michael, lead singer (Sixx:A.M.) and producer; co-wrote "Rest in Pieces" by Saliva
A. J. Muste, a Dutch-born American clergyman and political activist who attended Hope College
David Myers, psychologist, author
Milton J. Nieuwsma, author, Emmy-winning screenwriter and producer
Mike O'Brien, candidate for the U.S. House of Representatives and former Great Lakes project director for Bluewater Wind
Nathan Oostendorp, founder of Everything2
Erik Prince, founded Blackwater USA
Ron Schipper (d. 2006), football coach; member of College Football Hall of Fame
Willie Snead, NFL wide receiver
Herman Stegeman (d. 1939), varsity coach and athletics director at the University of Georgia at Athens (UGA)
Sufjan Stevens, singer-songwriter; attended Hope College, details the city in the song "Holland" on his 2003 concept album, Michigan''
Charles Symmonds, U.S. Army general
Matt Urban (d. 1995), U.S. Army lieutenant colonel, WWII; received 29 combat decorations and the Medal of Honor
Mary Jeanne van Appledorn, composer, pianist, and educator
Andy Van Hekken, professional baseball player
Brian Vander Ark, lead singer of The Verve Pipe
Luke Witkowski, Defenseman for NHL's Detroit Red Wings
Valerie van Heest, author, explorer, and museum designer, serving on the board of the Michigan Shipwreck Research Association.
William C. Vandenberg (1884–1971), 49th Lieutenant Governor of Michigan
Gordon Douglas Yntema (d. 1968), U.S. Army Sergeant, Vietnam War; Medal of Honor

See also 

 Herrick District Library
 Holland Civic Center

Notes

External links

 
 Holland Visitors site
 Holland Area Chamber of Commerce

Further reading
 

 
1847 establishments in Michigan
Cities in Allegan County, Michigan
Cities in Ottawa County, Michigan
Michigan Neighborhood Enterprise Zone
Populated places established in 1847